Charles Lynwood Smith Jr. (born February 25, 1943) is a senior United States district judge of the United States District Court for the Northern District of Alabama.

Education and career

Born in Talladega, Alabama, Smith received a Bachelor of Arts degree from the University of Alabama in 1966, a Master of Arts from Rutgers University in 1967, and a Juris Doctor from the University of Alabama School of Law in 1971. He was a law clerk to Frank H. McFadden of the United States District Court for the Northern District of Alabama from 1971 to 1972, and was thereafter in private practice in Huntsville, Alabama from 1972 to 1981. He was a lecturer in political science at the University of Alabama from 1972 to 1976. He was a judge on the Madison County District Court in 1981, and on the 23rd Judicial Circuit Court of Alabama from 1981 to 1995.

Federal judicial service

On December 8, 1995, Smith was nominated by President Bill Clinton to a seat on the United States District Court for the Northern District of Alabama vacated by Elbert Bertram Haltom Jr. Smith was confirmed by the United States Senate on December 22, 1995, and received his commission on December 26, 1995. He took senior status on August 31, 2013.

References

Sources

1943 births
Living people
People from Talladega, Alabama
Alabama state court judges
Judges of the United States District Court for the Northern District of Alabama
United States district court judges appointed by Bill Clinton
University of Alabama alumni
Rutgers University alumni
University of Alabama School of Law alumni
20th-century American judges
21st-century American judges